Eloy Fominaya (b. 10 June 1925 New York City; d. 8 April 2002, Augusta, Georgia), was an American contemporary composer, music educator at the collegiate level, conductor, violinist, and, as of 1985, a luthier.

His obituary in The Augusta Chronicle stated that had been a child prodigy in music.  Fominaya played the violin for Eleanor Roosevelt at the White House before the age of ten and, by the age of 15, performed Felix Mendelssohn's Violin Concerto in D with the National Symphony Orchestra in Washington, D.C.

Beginning 1966, Fominaya served as chair of the Fine Arts Department at Augusta State University for 16 years.  In total, Fominaya served 33 years at Augusta State University, teaching violin, composition, contemporary harmony/humanities and counterpoint.  He retired as a Professor of Music at age 70.

Fominaya was an associate conductor of the Augusta Symphony and played violin in the orchestra. He was musical director and conductor of the Augusta Chorale Society for 12 years.  He was director of the Augusta Youth Orchestra from 1966 to 1994.

Academic positions 
 Associate Professor of Music, University of Louisiana at Monroe
 1966–1997 — Various teaching positions, including Chairman, Music Department, Augusta College, Georgia

Education 
 1950 — Bachelor of Music (violin & music education) Lawrence University, Wisconsin
 Feb 1953 — Master of Music (major – composition; minor – violin), University of North Texas (studied composition with Violet Archer)
 1963 — Doctor of Philosophy in Music, Michigan State University
 Studied at Juilliard for 3 years
 Studied with master violin maker, Albert Ferdinand Moglie (1890–1988)
 1951 — Studied at Baylor University

External links 
 The Eloy Fominaya Collection at Michigan State University Library

References 
General references
 Contemporary American Composers, A biographical dictionary, first edition, compiled by E. Ruth Anderson (1928– ), G.K. Hall & Co., Boston (1976)
 Contemporary American Composers, A biographical dictionary, second edition, compiled by E. Ruth Anderson (1928– ), G.K. Hall & Co., Boston (1982)
 Who's Who in American Music: Classical, R.R. Bowker, New York (1983)

Inline citations

Contemporary classical music performers
American male classical composers
American classical composers
20th-century classical composers
21st-century classical composers
Postmodern composers
1925 births
2002 deaths
Lawrence University alumni
University of North Texas College of Music alumni
Michigan State University alumni
American music educators
21st-century American composers
20th-century American composers
20th-century American male musicians
21st-century American male musicians